Hay Street is a set of bus stops on ramps connecting the East Busway to Hay Street in Wilkinsburg.

References

Bus transportation in Pennsylvania
Port Authority of Allegheny County stations
Pittsburgh metropolitan area
Martin Luther King Jr. East Busway